"ResuRection" is a song by Russian trance music group PPK. It was released in 2001 as the lead single from their debut album Reload. The melody is based on the original melody "La mort du héros" ("Death of the hero") written by Eduard Artemyev for the 1979 Soviet movie Siberiade. 

The song was the first by a Russian act to enter the top 10 of the UK Singles Chart, peaking at number three in December 2001 and earning a silver certification from the British Phonographic Industry (BPI). Elsewhere, the song reached the top 10 in Flanders, Ireland, and the Netherlands while also charting in Australia, Finland, and Wallonia. In the United States, the song peaked at number 26 on the Billboard Dance Club Play chart in April 2002. In 2021, the song was ranked number 70 in A State of Trances "Trance Top 1000" list.

Paul Oakenfold signed the record to his label Perfecto Records upon hearing it when he was playing a set at Gorky Park in Moscow. During an episode of his Planet Perfecto Podcast in January 2021, Oakenfold revealed that PPK handed him the record, which he listened to on his headphones, and signed the record immediately.

Track listings

Charts and certifications

Weekly charts

Year-end charts

Certifications

Release history

References

2001 singles
2001 songs
Perfecto Records singles
UK Independent Singles Chart number-one singles